Jordan national football team has been historically considered weaker than other Arab teams prior to the beginning of new millennium. Jordan often struggled to win a ticket and qualify for the Asian Cup, mainly, due to historical turbulence inside the state.

However, once Jordan polished themselves in order to join the new world, Jordanian football also witnessed significant positive changes. Jordan qualified for their first Asian Cup in 2004, before did it again in 2011 and 2015. In the first two editions, Jordan stunned all predictions by drew and defeated so many Asian powerhouses such as South Korea, Japan and Saudi Arabia, and they were considered a heavy underdog which had qualified for the quarter-finals twice, their best result to date. In 2015 however, Jordan for the first time, had to go home from the group stage. Hence, Jordan's best result remains at the quarter-finals.

Jordan's Asian Cup record

Asian Cup 2004

This was Jordan's first ever Asian Cup in their history, following a successful qualification campaign. Although considered to be an underdog, Jordan surprised by drawing South Korea 0–0 before beating Kuwait 2–0 and drew the UAE 0–0, therefore passed into the quarter-finals right on their debut. Jordan even performed better than expected, when they drew giant Japan 1-1 before losing 3–4 on the penalty shootout. Ironically, despite Jordan had led Japan 3–1 on penalty shootout, subsequent misses and failed kicks had eliminated Jordan from the tournament. Japan would go on to win the title.

Group B

Quarter-finals

Asian Cup 2011

Having missed out the 2007 edition, Jordan returned in 2011 edition and once again was drawn with Japan, together with 2007 runners-up Saudi Arabia and Syria. Similar to 2004, Jordan, one more time, shocked by drawing Japan 1–1 before defeating Saudi Arabia and Syria to qualify with seven points. Making itself a heavy underdog for the second times, Jordan, however, soon fell to Uzbekistan as the Uzbeks had shown to be more resilience than the Jordanians. The Turkic side would have defeated the Chivalrous 2–1 in the quarter-finals again, before winning fourth place for the first time. This was the best performance of Jordan in the Asian Cup.

Group B

Quarter-finals

Asian Cup 2015

Jordan made their third debut by qualifying to the 2015 Asian Cup held in Australia. And, surprisingly once again, Jordan was drawn with Japan for the second times, together with Levant rivals Iraq and debutant Palestine. Having created a strong impression four years ago, Jordan was expected to at least, surprised again by qualifying to quarter-finals or even, reaching no.1 in the group. Their hopes were shattered by a 0–1 defeat to Iraq, before demolishing Palestine 5–1 with Hamza Al-Dardour made a double braces. Jordan would have met Japan in the last encounter, and they expected to even manage a surprising record again, having drawn Japan 1–1 in two previous encounters. Unfortunately, the Blue Samurais had learnt from their two previous mistakes and Jordan had to go home with a 0–2 defeat. This meant for the first time in their participancy, Jordan was out from the early stage.

Group D

Asian Cup 2019

Jordan once again qualified to the Asian Cup, and for the second time in their participation, Jordan didn't join Japan in the same group. Instead, Jordan will have to face up defending champions Australia, alongside their Levant rivals Syria and Palestine, once again. Jordan had met Palestine in four years ago, while they faced Australia in 2018 World Cup qualification. Jordan also faced Syria in 2011 edition. However, due to history being an underdog, Jordan is expected to make surprise again.

Jordan opened their account by a shocking impressive 1–0 win over defending champions Australia thanked for a header by Anas Bani Yaseen and an incredible performance by Khalil Bani Attiah, who prevented every Australian attacks. This trend of impressive performance continued with a 2–0 victory over neighboring rival Syria. The win over Australia and Syria helped Jordan to top the group, becoming the first team to progress to the knockout stage of the edition. The last group stage match against Palestine, which had little impact on Jordan's position, ended 0–0, and Jordan consolidated their first place, ultimately sent them to the encounter against Vietnam in the round of sixteen with a perfect record, scoring three and conceding zero goals.

Jordan played against Vietnam in the first knockout stage's match. Prior to the encounter, Jordanian media and press had signaled in confident against Vietnam, the last team to qualify for the stage, and even confirmed for a full victory. Jordan eventually led 1–0 with a superb free kick by Baha' Abdel-Rahman. However, the second half witnessed a complete Vietnamese resurgence, with Nguyễn Công Phượng became the first player to net on Amer Shafi, turned the tie into a draw 1–1. The draw was maintained after 120', but with all confidences lost, Jordan failed on the penalty shootout to Vietnam with the score 2–4, ultimately sending Jordan out from the campaign.

Group B

Round of 16

References

Countries at the AFC Asian Cup
Asian Cup